Red beech is a common name applied to several species of trees:

Dillenia alata, native to Northern Australia and New Guinea
Fuscospora fusca, native to New Zealand
Protorhus longifolia, native to South Africa